Battler or Battlers may refer to:

Common uses
 Battler (underdog), an Australian colloquialism referring to working class individuals who persevere through their commitments despite adversity
 Combatant, the legal status of an individual who has the right to engage in hostilities during an armed conflict
 Soldier, a person who is a member of an armed force (usually an army)
 Warrior, a person specializing in combat or warfare

Arts and entertainment
 Battler (album), a 2009 album by Gregory Douglass
"The Battler", a 1925 short story by Ernest Hemingway
 The Battlers (novel), a 1941 novel by Kylie Tennant
 The Battlers, an Australian television miniseries based on the novel
 The Battlers (TV series), an Australian television series
 Battler Ushiromiya, the main protagonist in the visual novel series Umineko When They Cry

Other uses
 Barcode Battler, a handheld game console
 HMS Battler (D18), an American-built escort aircraft carrier that served with the Royal Navy during the Second World War

See also
 Butler (disambiguation)
 Battle (disambiguation)